Angarf or Angaref is a small town in Ouarzazate Province, in the Drâa-Tafilalet region of Morocco. The area is noted for its granite pegmatite.

References

Populated places in Ouarzazate Province